Dendroides is a genus of fire-colored beetles in the family Pyrochroidae. There are about seven described species in Dendroides.

Species
These seven species belong to the genus Dendroides:
 Dendroides canadensis Leconte (fire-colored beetle)
 Dendroides concolor (Newman, 1838)
 Dendroides ephemeroides (Mannerheim, 1852)
 Dendroides marginata Van Dyke, 1928
 Dendroides marginatus Van Dyke, 1928
 Dendroides picipes Horn, 1880
 Dendroides testaceus LeConte, 1855

References

Further reading

External links

 

Pyrochroidae
Articles created by Qbugbot
Tenebrionoidea genera
Taxa named by Pierre André Latreille